The Drill Master diving accident was an incident in Norway in January 1974 that claimed the lives of two Ocean Systems commercial divers. The two divers, Per Skipnes and Robert John Smyth, both died from rapid decompression and drowning. The accident was caused by instructions aboard Drill Master which had not been updated when the bell system was modified and which stated that a valve should be closed during the dive which should have been open.

References 

Accidental deaths in Norway
Commercial diving accidents
History of the petroleum industry in Norway
January 1974 events in Europe
Maritime incidents in 1974
Maritime incidents in Norway
1974 disasters in Europe
1974 in Norway